Amr Gamal (born 1983) is a Yemeni film, television and theater director. He lives and works in Aden.

Life and education 
Amr was born in 1983 in Poland. He grew up there until he was six years old and then moved to Aden in 1989. He received basic education and in 2007 he graduated from University of Aden.

Filmography 

 10 Days Before the Wedding, 2018
 The Burdened, 2023

Awards 

 President's Award in playwriting, 2003

References 

Yemeni film directors
Yemeni dramatists and playwrights
1983 births
Yemeni screenwriters
Yemeni television directors
Living people